Cratera nigrimarginata is a species of land planarian found in Brazil.

Description 

The dorsum has a light-brownish color forming a broad band and is bordered by greyish or black margins. The venter is pale yellow.

The several eyes of C. nigrimarginata are distributed marginally in the first millimeters of the body and posteriorly become dorsal, occupying almost the whole dorsal surface on the anterior third of the body, becoming less numerous towards the anterior tip.

Etymology 
The specific epithet nigrimarginata comes from Latin niger, black + marginata, bordered, thus meaning "black-bordered" and refers to the black margins of the body.

Distribution 
Cratera nigrimarginata is known only a private reserve, the Araucaria Natural Heritage Private Reserve, in the municipality of General Carneiro, Paraná, Brazil.

References 

Geoplanidae
Invertebrates of Brazil